Ölziitiin Badrakh (1895 – July 30, 1941) was a Mongolian politician who served as secretary of the Mongolian People's Revolutionary Party from 1928 to 1932.  Blamed for the excesses of the "Leftist Deviation", he was expelled from the MPRP Central Committee in 1932.  He was arrested in 1937, accused of conspiring to create a separatist Dörvöd region.  He was tried and executed in Moscow on July 30, 1941.

Biography
Badrakh was born in present-day Davst district, Uvs Province in 1895. He served as Minister of Finance from 1924 to 1925. Known as one of the "rurals", he was one of several younger, more radicalized party members from rural areas (others included Jambyn Lkhümbe, Tsengeltiin Jigjidjav, Zolbingiin Shijee, Bat-Ochiryn Eldev-Ochir, and Peljidiin Genden) recruited by the Soviets in the late 1920s to challenge the MRPR "old guard" of Balingiin Tserendorj, Tseren-Ochiryn Dambadorj, and Anandyn Amar.

He was elected member of the MPRP Presidium (Politburo) from 1925 to 1932. At the Seventh MPRP Congress in October 1928, Badrakh was elected one of three secretaries of the MPRP Central Committee (a position he held until June 30, 1932) after the rightists under Tseren-Ochiryn Dambadorj were defeated.  He served briefly as First Secretary from December 11, 1928 until January 30, 1929.

He was expelled from Central Committee in 1932 for his role in the "Leftist Deviation" in which certain party leaders were blamed for overzealously and prematurely attempting to implement socialist policies of forced collectivization and property confiscation and was named minister of health from 1932 to 1934.  In 1937 he was arrested on charges of counterrevolution, accused of heading the "Badrakh Group" along with Zolbingiin Shijee that sought to create a breakaway autonomous Dörvöd region in present-day Uvs Province. He was sent to Moscow, sentenced to death by the Soviet Military Collegium of the USSR Supreme Court on July 7, 1941, and executed on July 30, 1941.

He was rehabilitated in 1963.

Notes

Finance ministers of Mongolia
Mongolian communists
Mongolian People's Party politicians
Communism in Mongolia
Great Purge victims from Mongolia
Mongolian people executed abroad
1895 births
1941 deaths
People from Uvs Province
Government ministers of Mongolia
Executed communists